Ciprian Andrei Marica (born 2 October 1985) is a Romanian former footballer and minority shareholder of Farul Constanța. He played as a centre forward.

Club career

Dinamo București
Marica's first professional club team was Dinamo București, from the city in which he was born. He started to gain attention even though he only played 23 games (scoring four goals) in three years with the club.

Shakhtar Donetsk
Ciprian transferred to the Ukrainian top club and played his so far best seasons with them. He gained international experience, getting to play in the UEFA Cup European competition.

VfB Stuttgart

On 23 July 2007, he transferred to German club VfB Stuttgart, after his former club, Shakhtar Donetsk, rejected another offer, from English team Derby County amongst interest from Manchester City. Marica signed a 5-year contract. Stuttgart sporting director Horst Heldt said: "Ciprian is a very flexible forward, and a permanent thorn in the side of any opposition defence, who fits outstandingly into our team. He wanted to join us desperately."

Marica made his debut for VfB in the Bundesliga on 12 August 2007, in a home game against Schalke 04 (2–2). In his first season, he got plenty of appearances (28), scoring only two goals in those (plus one goal in the UEFA Champions League, which led Stuttgart to their win against the Rangers F.C.).

After this first failed season then-coach Armin Veh mistrusted Marica, giving him only few appearances. Things seemed to get better after the sacking of Veh. New coach Markus Babbel entrusted him to play instead of Cacau, but Marica again failed to impress.

Only after Christian Gross replaced Babbel as VfB coach, Marica got a new chance, mainly profiting by long-time injury of Cacau. This time Marica didn't disappoint his coach, scoring four goals in three consecutive matches. (Two goals in a 2–0 victory for VfB on 20 March 2010 match in Bundesliga against Hannover 96, the winning goal on 27 March 2010 away at Bayern Munich and the equalizing goal in a 2–1 victory against Borussia Mönchengladbach on 3 April 2010.)

As of season 2010–11 he started again to be only the third choice behind Cacau and Pavel Pogrebnyak.

On 12 July 2011, Marica was released from his contract at Stuttgart.

Schalke 04
On 28 July 2011, Marica signed a two-year contract with German club Schalke 04, worth €5m. He chose to remain in Germany, despite having offers from Premier League club Blackburn Rovers, and other two French clubs such as Marseille and Paris Saint-Germain.

In a match against Maccabi Haifa, on 14 December, Marica scored one goal, to help his team to a 3–0 win. On 29 January 2012, Marica scored a double against 1. FC Köln Although Lukas Podolski opened the score in the first half, Marica made it 2–1 for FC Schalke 04, with the game eventually ending in a 4–1 win for his team. Towards the end of his contract with the team he received interest from teams such as Shakhtar, Lazio and Inter.

Getafe
On 27 September 2013, Marica signed a contract with Spanish La Liga side Getafe. He made his Getafe debut on 6 October as a substitute in the 3–1 win against Betis Sevilla. On 31 October, Marica scored his first league goal in a 2–0 away win against Villarreal. In May 2014, he scored twice in a 2–1 win over Rayo Vallecano, keeping Getafe out of the relegation zone.

Konyaspor
In the summer of 2014, Marica signed a two-year contract with Turkish side Konyaspor. On 15 October 2015, he was released by Konyaspor. Marica played only seven games in 14 months for the Turkish side, mainly because of his injuries.

FCSB
On 14 January 2016, Marica reached an agreement with FCSB, thus returning to Romania after twelve years. He became the 59th footballer to play for both big Bucharest rivals, Dinamo and FCSB. In his first match with FCSB, a 2–0 victory against Concordia Chiajna, he played from the start and was replaced after 84 minutes. His performance was deemed weak and conservative, as he only managed to get two opportunities in a game in which he was otherwise unremarkable.

International career

Marica scored 25 goals in 71 caps. He made his debut on 16 November 2003, in a friendly game with Italy played in Ancona and won by Squadra Azzurra 1–0. Marica was introduces in the 81st minute, replacing Daniel Pancu. His first goal for the national team came on 17 November 2004, in a match against Armenia.

On 25 March 2008, he was awarded the "Meritul Sportiv", class III medal, by the president of Romania, Traian Băsescu for the results on Qualifying to EURO 2008 and qualification to UEFA Euro 2008 Group C.

He scored his first double for Romania in a 2012 European championship qualifying match against Bosnia and Herzegovina, on 3 June 2011.

He scored his first ever hat-trick for Romania in a friendly match against Trinidad and Tobago, on 4 June 2013.

Career statistics

Club

International

Scores and results list Romania's goal tally first, score column indicates score after each Marica goal.

Honours
Dinamo București
Divizia A: 2001–02
Cupa României: 2002–03

Shakhtar Donetsk
Vyshcha Liha: 2004–05, 2005–06
Ukrainian Cup: 2003–04
Ukrainian Supercup: 2005

Steaua București
Cupa Ligii: 2015–16

References

External links

  
 
 
 
 

1985 births
Living people
Footballers from Bucharest
Romanian footballers
Association football forwards
FC Dinamo București players
FC Shakhtar Donetsk players
VfB Stuttgart players
FC Schalke 04 players
Getafe CF footballers
Konyaspor footballers
FC Steaua București players
Liga I players
Ukrainian Premier League players
Bundesliga players
La Liga players
Süper Lig players
Romanian expatriate footballers
Expatriate footballers in Germany
Expatriate footballers in Ukraine
Expatriate footballers in Spain
Expatriate footballers in Turkey
Romanian expatriate sportspeople in Germany
Romanian expatriate sportspeople in Ukraine
Romanian expatriate sportspeople in Spain
Romanian expatriate sportspeople in Turkey
Romania international footballers
Romania under-21 international footballers
UEFA Euro 2008 players